The 1897 Cornell Big Red football team was an American football team that represented Cornell University during the 1897 college football season.  In their first season under head coach Pop Warner, the Big Red compiled a 5–3–1 record and outscored all opponents by a combined total of 133 to 42. Three Cornell players received honors on the 1897 College Football All-America Team: quarterback George Young, Cornell (Walter Camp-2, Outing-1); end William McKeever (Camp-2); and end Lyndon S. Tracy, Cornell (Camp-3).

Schedule

References

Cornell
Cornell Big Red football seasons
Cornell Big Red football